Alan Lybrooks Henderson (born December 2, 1972) is an American former professional basketball player of the National Basketball Association (NBA). He stands 6'9" (2.06 m) tall. Born in Morgantown, West Virginia, Henderson attended Brebeuf Jesuit Preparatory School in Indianapolis, Indiana. They lost the state championship game his senior year to Glenn Robinson's Gary Roosevelt squad. In 1994, he was a part of the US men's basketball team for the Goodwill Games.

College career

While at Indiana University, Henderson led the team in rebounding all four years. Currently, he is the only Indiana University player to rank in the school's top five in rebounding, blocked shots and steals. He is ninth in scoring and appeared in the Final Four in 1992. His 23.5 points per game scoring average for the 1995 season is the highest single season scoring average for any Indiana player during Bob Knight's 29-year tenure.  Henderson was accepted into medical school at Indiana University and Howard University School of Medicine in 1995. He is also a member of Kappa Alpha Psi fraternity, and graduated from college with a degree in biology.

NBA career

In 1995, Henderson was selected with the 16th pick in the NBA draft by the Atlanta Hawks, and has since played for the Hawks, the Dallas Mavericks, Cleveland Cavaliers, and the Philadelphia 76ers.

In his rookie year (1995–96) with the Hawks, he ranked 2nd on the team in total blocked shots (43). During the 1997–98 season, he was the recipient of the NBA Most Improved Player Award after averaging 14.3 points and 6.4 rebounds. He remained a member of an Atlanta team that for nine of his tenured seasons did not improve significantly nor get very far in the postseason when they qualified for the Playoffs.

On August 4, 2004, along with Jason Terry, Henderson was traded to the Dallas Mavericks for Antoine Walker and Tony Delk. He was then traded to the Milwaukee Bucks along with Calvin Booth for Keith Van Horn on February 24, 2005. The Bucks then waived Henderson the following day. On March 1, he re-signed with the Mavericks.

On September 17, 2005, Henderson signed with the Cleveland Cavaliers, appearing in 51 games as a reserve power forward.

On September 8, 2006, Henderson signed a free agent contract with the Philadelphia 76ers.

On February 22, 2007, Henderson was traded to the Utah Jazz along with cash for the rights to swap draft picks in the second round of the 2007 NBA Draft, but was released from the team on March 2. In early April, he was re-signed by the 76ers to a contract for the remainder of the season. He averaged 7.8 points, 5 rebounds and 0.6 assists in 652 NBA games.

External links
NBA.com profile
Basketball-reference profile

References

1972 births
Living people
African-American basketball players
All-American college men's basketball players
American men's basketball players
Atlanta Hawks draft picks
Atlanta Hawks players
Basketball players from Indianapolis
Basketball players from West Virginia
Cleveland Cavaliers players
Dallas Mavericks players
Indiana Hoosiers men's basketball players
McDonald's High School All-Americans
Parade High School All-Americans (boys' basketball)
Philadelphia 76ers players
Power forwards (basketball)
Sportspeople from Morgantown, West Virginia
Goodwill Games medalists in basketball
Competitors at the 1994 Goodwill Games
21st-century African-American sportspeople
20th-century African-American sportspeople